The Terminologia Embryologica (TE) is a standardized list of words used in the description of human embryologic and fetal structures. It was produced by the Federative International Committee on Anatomical Terminology on behalf of the International Federation of Associations of Anatomists and posted on the Internet since 2010. It has been approved by the General Assembly of the IFAA during the seventeenth International Congress of Anatomy in Cape Town (August 2009).

It is analogous to the Terminologia Anatomica (TA), which standardizes terminology for adult human anatomy and which deals primarily with naked-eye adult anatomy. It succeeds the Nomina Embryologica, which was included as a component of the Nomina Anatomica.

It was not included in the original version of the TA.

Codes
 e1.0: General terms 
 e2.0: Ontogeny 
 e3.0: Embryogeny 
 e4.0: General histology 
 e5.0: Bones; Skeletal system 
 e5.1: Joints; Articular system 
 e5.2: Muscles; Muscular system 
 e5.3: Face 
 e5.4: Alimentary system 
 e5.5: Respiratory system 
 e5.6: Urinary system 
 e5.7: Genital systems 
 e5.8: Coelom and septa 
 e5.9: Mesenchymal mesenteric masses 
 e5.10: Endocrine glands 
 e5.11: Cardiovascular system 
 e5.12: Lymphoid system 
 e5.13: Nervous system 
 e5.14: Central nervous system 
 e5.15: Peripheral nervous system 
 e5.16: Sense organs 
 e5.17: The integument 
 e6.0: Extraembryonic and fetal membranes 
 e7.0: Embryogenesis (-> 13 st) 
 e7.0: Embryogenesis (14 st ->) 
 e7.1: Fetogenesis 
 e7.2: Features of mature neonate 
 e8.0: Dysmorphia terms

See also
Terminologia Anatomica
Terminologia Histologica
International Morphological Terminology
Federative International Committee on Anatomical Terminology

References

External links

 The Federative International Programme for Anatomical Terminology

Anatomical terminology
Embryology